The president of the Chamber of Deputies of the Dominican Republic is the speaker of the lower chamber of the legislature. 

The lower chamber was called Tribunado 1844-1854, then Chamber of Representatives 1854-1878, and Chamber of Deputies since 1878.

Presidents of Tribunado 1844-1854

Presidents of the lower chamber called Chamber of Representatives 1854-1878

Presidents of the lower chamber called Chamber of Deputies since 1878

References

 
Politics of the Dominican Republic
Legislative speakers
Dominican Republic